Brachygobius doriae, the bumblebee goby, is a species of goby native to fresh and brackish waters of Indonesia, Brunei and Singapore, Malaysia, Cambodia, Thailand and Vietnam.  This species can reach a length of  TL. It is listed as Least Concern as no threats are known and it is popular in the aquarium trade.

References

doriae
Fish described in 1868
Taxa named by Albert Günther